Spencer Lee Wilding (born 26 July 1972) is a Welsh actor and special creature performer in the UK. He is from Meliden in Denbighshire, North Wales. He has also had some success as a professional kickboxer and professional cruiser weight boxer. He was trained by former three-time world champion Russ Williams.

Filmography

References

External links 
 
 
 

1972 births
Living people
Welsh male film actors